Surfing terminology